Władysław Wojtakajtis (3 February 1949 – 2 March 2016) was a Polish freestyle swimmer. He competed at the 1968 Summer Olympics and the 1972 Summer Olympics.

References

External links
 

1949 births
2016 deaths
Polish male freestyle swimmers
Olympic swimmers of Poland
Swimmers at the 1968 Summer Olympics
Swimmers at the 1972 Summer Olympics
Universiade medalists in swimming
People from Starogard Gdański
Universiade bronze medalists for Poland
Medalists at the 1970 Summer Universiade
20th-century Polish people